"I Will Be With You" is a song by British band T'Pau, released in 1988 from the seventh and final single from their debut studio album, Bridge of Spies (1987). It was written by Carol Decker and Ron Rogers, and produced by Roy Thomas Baker. "I Will Be with You" reached No. 14 on the UK Singles Chart and remained in the charts for six weeks.

A music video was filmed to promote the single. The single's B-side, "Still So in Love", was exclusive to the single. The 12" single contained the exclusive track "Thank You For Goodbye Rides Again", which was a re-working of the Bridge of Spies track "Thank You For Goodbye". The CD single bonus track "Walk Away Rene" featured Rogers on lead vocals.

Critical reception
Upon its release as a single, Pan-European magazine Music & Media described the song as "a rock ballad that shows off Carol Decker's voice well" and "a big, overblown pop song that will undoubtedly do well". Tim Nicholson of Record Mirror was critical of the song and predicated a commercial decline for the band. He wrote, "I am pleased to report that this is even duller than the last T'Pau record".

Track listing
7-inch single
"I Will Be with You" - 4:05
"Still So in Love" - 3:25

12-inch single
"I Will Be with You" - 4:05
"Thank You For Goodbye Rides Again" - 4:10
"Still So in Love" - 3:25

CD single
"I Will Be with You" - 4:05
"Still So in Love" - 3:25
"Thank You For Goodbye Rides Again" - 4:10
"Walk Away Rene" - 3:45

Personnel
T'Pau
 Carol Decker – lead vocals
 Dean Howard – lead guitar
 Ronnie Rogers – rhythm guitar, vocals on "Walk Away Rene"
 Michael Chetwood – keyboards
 Paul Jackson – bass guitar
 Tim Burgess – drums

Production
 Roy Thomas Baker - producer of "I Will Be with You"
 Jerry Napier - engineer on "I Will Be with You"
 Ronnie Rogers - producer and mixing on "Still So in Love"
 Norman Goodman - engineer and mixing on "Still So in Love"
 Tim Burgess - mixing on "Still So in Love"

Other
 Mark Millington - sleeve design
 Simon Fowler - front cover photography

Charts

References

External links

1987 songs
1988 singles
T'Pau (band) songs
Song recordings produced by Roy Thomas Baker
Songs written by Carol Decker
Songs written by Ron Rogers
Virgin Records singles